Neuendorf B is a village and a former municipality in the Vorpommern-Greifswald district, in Mecklenburg-Vorpommern, Germany. The municipality consisted of the villages of Janow and Neuendorf B. In south of Janow there are the ruins of Veste Landskron (also Lanzkron). Since 1 January 2012, it is part of the municipality Spantekow.

References

Former municipalities in Mecklenburg-Western Pomerania